Thorr's Hammer was an American-Norwegian death-doom band.

History
Thorr's Hammer was formed in Ballard, Seattle, Washington by Greg Anderson and Stephen O'Malley during winter 1994–1995. Soon after, Runhild Gammelsæter, then a 17-year-old Norwegian exchange student, joined the band as vocalist/lyricist. The band reached its final form when Jamie Sykes and James Hale joined. The band was active only for six weeks during which it played two gigs and recorded a demo and an EP titled Dommedagsnatt. In 1997, the song "Troll" from their EP Dommedagsnatt was released on The Awakening - Females in Extreme Music, a compilation album from Dwell Records. 

The band disbanded after Gammelsæter's return to Oslo, Norway. Burning Witch was formed from the ashes of Thorr's Hammer, and Gammelsæter collaborated with James Plotkin (Khanate) to form Khlyst. Khlyst released a full-length album Chaos Is My Name in 2006, and a live album Chaos Live in 2008.

Thorr's Hammer reunited in 2009 to play at the Supersonic Festival in Birmingham, England, and again in 2010 for The Roadburn Festival in Tilburg, Netherlands. In an interview with Rock-A-Rolla magazine, Runhild Gammelsæter said the band "might make some new music" in the future.

Line-up
Runhild Gammelsæter (a.k.a. Ozma) – vocals and lyrics
Greg Anderson – guitar ("drones and sunns")
Stephen O'Malley – guitar ("crust and earth")
James Hale – bass guitar ("subsonic attack") (replaced by Guy Pinhas at the 2009 & 2010 reunion shows)
Jamie Sykes – drums ("battledrums")

Discography 
Sannhet i Blodet (demo 1995)
Dommedagsnatt (cassette 1996, CD 1998, CD reissue 2004, picture disc 2004)
Only Death Is Real – Live by Command of Tom G. Warrior (LP 2019, recorded live at Roadburn 2010)
Awakening – Females in Extreme Music (CD 1997)

References

External links
Thorr's Hammer at the website of Southern Lord Records
Thorr's Hammer at Encyclopaedia Metallum

American death metal musical groups
Norwegian death metal musical groups
Norwegian doom metal musical groups
Heavy metal musical groups from Washington (state)
Musical groups established in 1994
1994 establishments in Washington (state)
Musical groups disestablished in 1995
1995 disestablishments in Washington (state)